Live and More is the first live album recorded by American singer-songwriter Donna Summer, and it was her second double album, released on August 28, 1978 by Casablanca Records. The live concert featured on the first three sides of this double album was recorded in the Universal Amphitheater, Los Angeles, California in 1978.

Background and release
During the concert, Summer performed a large number of her disco songs - both her hit singles, and a selection of songs from her previous album, Once Upon a Time. However, in this album, Donna also experiments with other musical styles such as jazz, in a medley she named "The My Man Medley". It consists of the George Gershwin song, "The Man I Love", together with "I Got It Bad and That Ain't Good" and the old standard "Some of These Days", neither of which she had recorded previously. She also performed a version of the ballad "The Way We Were", originally recorded by Barbra Streisand for the film of the same name, again, not previously recorded by Summer, but a big live favorite of hers. This was followed by a self-written ballad called "Mimi's Song", dedicated to her young daughter, Mimi.  Mimi was present at this concert for Summer to sing the song to, and she is heard on the recording saying goodnight to the audience. The concert ends with one of Summer's best-known songs in the United States - "Last Dance". This hit song is included on the soundtrack of the film Thank God It's Friday, in which Summer had also acted. The composer, Paul Jabara, won an Academy Award for Best Song from a motion picture, and Summer herself won her first Grammy Award for Best Female R&B Vocal Performance with this song. Some versions of "Last Dance" have the slow part removed from the middle but kept at the beginning. The full version, however, was sung at this concert.

The fourth and final side of this double LP album contains a new studio recording entitled "MacArthur Park Suite", which is a medley of four songs including the main song "MacArthur Park", originally recorded as a ballad by the Irish actor Richard Harris. Summer's disco version was edited and issued as a single, and it became one of her biggest hits - her first number one song on the American Billboard Hot 100 singles chart, and a Top five song in the United Kingdom.
This song also earned Summer a Grammy Award nomination for Best Female Pop Vocal Performance. Another song in the medley, "Heaven Knows" was an American Top five hit, and it featured vocals by Joe Esposito of the Brooklyn Dreams musical group. That group included the musician Bruce Sudano, whom Summer would later marry.

Critical and commercial reception

The album received mixed to favorable reviews from music critics. Stephen Cook from AllMusic website gave the album three out of five stars and wrote that none of the album's songs "eclipse the original versions" but concluded that it is a "very enjoyable concert recording". Robert Christgau gave the album a "C" and criticized the arrangements and the song "Mac Arthur Park Suite," to which he preferred Andy Kaufman's interpretation. Tom Carson from Rolling Stone magazine gave the album a favorable review and wrote that even though "the hits are exiled to side three, they come across fairly well".

Live and More would become Summer's first number one double album in the United States, and achieved double platinum status in the U.S.

Track listing
All tracks written by Donna Summer, Giorgio Moroder and Pete Bellotte except where noted; all tracks produced by Moroder and Bellotte.

Notes
When Live and More was released on compact disc (CD), the disk-format of that time could only hold a maximum of 74 minutes. Rather than release the album as a two-disc set, it was released as a single CD, and "MacArthur Park Suite" was replaced with an extended version of the song "Down Deep Inside", which Summer had recorded for the film soundtrack for The Deep during the previous year. The "MacArthur Park Suite", as featured on the various artists compilation, The Casablanca Records Story, and the Bad Girls Deluxe Edition. is the 12-inch single version, not the original album version. The album version can only be found on The Dance Collection: A Compilation of Twelve Inch Singles CD, the original Live and More vinyl LP album itself, and the Japanese CD issue of Live and More (Mercury PHCR 1032). The 12-inch version replaces the original album version of "Heaven Knows" with the 7-inch version; "One of a Kind" was trimmed of some of its percussion breaks.
The 7-inch version of "Heaven Knows" was created by combining the vocals from Summer's Live and More album with the instrumental tracks from Brooklyn Dreams' Sleepless Nights album (on that album Joe Esposito sings the lead vocal and Brooklyn Dreams sing the chorus) - a rare instance of a Summer 7-inch single which is actually longer than the album version. Bob Esty produced and arranged the Sleepless Nights album and should be given co-producer and arranger credit for the 7" version of "Heaven Knows" but the liner notes in every Summer compilation released to date only list Giorgio Moroder and Pete Bellotte as producers and mistakenly credit Greg Mathieson as the arranger.
Universal Music Japan released a mini LP SHM-CD version of Live and More on August 8, 2012 in Japan (together with seven other Donna Summer albums) which restored the original cover art and included "MacArthur Park Suite".

Personnel

 Donna Summer – vocals
 Keith Forsey – drums
 Richard Adelman – drums
 Sal Guglielmi – bass
 Ken Park – percussion
 Bob Conti – percussion
 Peter Woodford – rhythm guitar
 Mike Warren – lead guitar
 Doug Livingston – keyboards
 Virgil Weber – synthesizer
 Greg Mathieson – Moog synthesizer, clavinet
 Bobby Shew – trumpet
 Rich Cooper – trumpet
 Dalton Smith – trumpet
 Bruce Paulson – trombone
 Bob Payne – trombone
 Dick "Slide" Hyde – bass trombone
 Dick Spencer – alto saxophone
 Don Menza – tenor saxophone
 Joe Romano – baritone saxophone
 John Santulis – concertmaster, violins
 Pauel Farkas – violins
 Mari Tsumura – violins
 Teri Schoebrua – violins
 Jay Rosen – violins
 Lya Stern – violins
 Leonard Selic – viola
 Alfred Barr – viola
 Victor Sazer – cello
 Robert Adcock – cello
 John Fresco – contractor
 Sheri Wish – production manager
 Keith Robertson – stage manager
 Bryan Rooney – assistant stage manager
 Sunshine (Carlena Williams, Dara Bernard, Pamela Quinlan, Mary Ellen Bernard) - backing vocals
 Mike North – equipment
 Marc Figueroa – equipment
 Stanal Sound (Bob Ludwig, Jim Fox, John Taylor) – sound
 Lighting designed by Patrick Woodroffe for TFA Electrosound
 Graphics: Stephen Lumel, Henry Vizcarra
 Photographs by Francesco Scavullo
  Photography assistant: Sean Byrnes
 Donna Summer logotype: Tom Nikosey
 Costumes: David Picon
 Management: Susan Munao Management & Joyce Bogart Management Co.

Production
 Produced by Giorgio Moroder and Pete Bellotte
 Recorded live at the Universal Amphitheatre, Los Angeles, CA. except "MacArthur Park Suite", a studio recording
 Engineered by: Juergen Koppers, Gary Ladinsky, Steve Smith
 Mixdown engineer: Juergen Koppers
 Mixed at Westlake Studios and Rust Studios
 Conducted by: Michael Warren

Charts and certifications

Weekly charts

Year-end charts

Certifications and sales

References

External links
 Donna Summer Live And More album info at Discogs

1978 live albums
Albums produced by Pete Bellotte
Albums produced by Giorgio Moroder
Casablanca Records live albums
Donna Summer live albums